The Church in the Province of the West Indies is one of 40 member provinces in the worldwide Anglican Communion. The church comprises eight dioceses spread out over much of the West Indies area. The present position of Archbishop and Primate of the West Indies is held by the current bishop of Jamaica, Howard Gregory. Gregory was elected as the thirteenth Archbishop of the Province by clergy and laity attending the 40th Synod of the CPWI at the Cascadia Hotel, in Port of Spain, Trinidad in May 2019. The position was previously held by John Holder who retired in 2018. Drexel Gomez was the primate before Bishop Holder until 2009. The church is also part of the Global South.

History
The West Indies became a self-governing province in 1883 because of the Church of England missions in territories that became British colonies. It is made up of two mainland dioceses and six island dioceses, including Barbados, Belize, Guyana, Jamaica, the Bahamas, the North-Eastern Caribbean and Aruba, Trinidad and Tobago, and the Windward Islands. Great emphasis is being placed on training personnel for an indigenous ministry. The island locations and scattered settlements make pastoral care difficult and costly.

Mission organisations
The Jamaica Church Missionary Society is the recognised missionary agency of the Diocese of Jamaica and the Cayman Islands in the Province of the West Indies. The society focuses on evangelisation with special relevance to daily human needs.

The society was established in 1861 as a subsidiary of the church, intended to target those sections of Jamaica's "hard to reach" population. For many years the mission stations established and maintained by the society provided the only means of reaching the masses of the population with Christianity and basic education.

Theological college
The Codrington College, an Anglican preparatory in Saint John, Barbados, opened in 1745.

Dioceses
The Bahamas and the Turks and Caicos Islands
Barbados
Belize
Guyana
Jamaica and the Cayman Islands
North East Caribbean and Aruba
Trinidad and Tobago
Windward Islands

See also

Anglican churches in the Americas
Archbishop of the West Indies
Caribbean Conference of Churches

References

External links
Anglican Communion provincial website
Church of England history in the West Indies
Anglicanism in the West Indies and Caribbean from Project Canterbury
Anglican Diocese of Belize Web site
About St. Kitts Anglican Church — part of the Diocese of North East Caribbean and Aruba

 
 01
West Indies
West Indies
Members of the World Council of Churches
Religious organizations established in 1883
Christian denominations established in the 19th century